Benedetto Scortechini (1845–1886) was an Italian botanist, explorer, and Roman Catholic priest.

Biography
He graduated from the Sapienza University of Rome as a priest and a lawyer. Accompanied by the priest Jerome Davadi (1846–1900) and one other Italian priest, Scortechini arrived in Brisbane on 28 February 1871. The three Italian priests were brought, shortly after the end of the First Vatican Council, to the Roman Catholic Archdiocese of Brisbane by Bishop James Quinn, the first Roman Catholic Bishop of Brisbane. After briefly working in Stanhope, Victoria and in Roma, Queensland, Scortechini was stationed in Gympie, Queensland from 1873 to 1875. In 1875 he was appointed the pastor of Logan Parish within the County of Ward, Queensland, where he remained the pastor for nine years until he left Australia in 1884.

George King, Director of the Royal Botanic Garden Calcutta, arranged with Sir Hugh Low, the British Resident at Perak, to employ plant collectors to work in Peninsular Malaysia. As part of this programme, King and Low recruited Hermann H. Kunstler (1837–1887) and Scortechini. Botanical specimens were sent to George King in Calcutta with duplicates sent to Kew Gardens.

Upon his death, Scortechini's collections were given to the Calcutta herbarium.

Eponyms

Genus
 (Nitschkiaceae, Fungi) Scortechinia Sacc. (1885)
 (Euphorbiaceae) Neoscortechinia Pax (1897)

Species

 (Acanthaceae) Filetia scortechinii C.B.Clarke
 (Annonaceae) Cyathocalyx scortechinii (King) J.Sinclair
 (Annonaceae) Goniothalamus scortechinii (King)
 (Annonaceae) Melodorum scortechinii (King) Finet & Gagnep.
 (Apocynaceae) Hoya scortechinii King & Gamble
 (Araliaceae) Schefflera scortechinii (King) R.Vig. synonym for Schefflera hullettii R. Vig
 (Arecaceae) Eleiodoxa scortechinii (Becc.) Burret synonym for Eleiodoxa conferta
 (Asclepiadaceae) Secamone scortechinii (King & Gamble) Klack.
 (Caesalpiniaceae) Caesalpinia scortechinii (F.Muell.) Hattink
 (Convolvulaceae) Argyreia scortechinii (Prain) Prain ex Hoogland
 (Gesneriaceae) Didymocarpus scortechinii (Ridl.) B.L.Burtt synonym of Henckelia scortechinii (Ridl.) A.Weber
 (Loranthaceae) Baratranthus scortechinii (Engl.) Tiegh. synonym of Baranthus axanthus Miq.
 (Rhamnaceae) Stenanthemum scortechinii (F.Muell.) Maiden & Betche synonym of Spyridium scortechinii
 (Rubiaceae) Carinta scortechinii (King) Thoth. synonym of Geophila scortechinii
 (Theaceae) Ternstroemia scortechinii Szyszył.
 (Vitaceae) Tetrastigma scortechinii (King) Gagnep.

Selected publications
 . 1881. 
 . 1885. 
Mycetes Malacenses: funghi della penisola di Malacca raccolti nel 1885 dall'ab. Benedetto Scortechini. Editor Tip. Antonelli, 42 pp.

References

External links

1845 births
1886 deaths
Sapienza University of Rome alumni
19th-century Italian Roman Catholic priests
19th-century Italian botanists
Members of the Linnean Society of New South Wales
People from the Province of Ancona
Plant collectors
Botanical collectors active in Australia